The Cathedral Basilica of Our Lady of Assumption  also called Caxias do Sul Cathedral It is a Catholic cathedral-basilica, the seat of the Archdiocese of Mariana. It is located in the state of Minas Gerais, in the city of Mariana, Brazil. is dedicated to Our Lady of the Assumption.

The current parish of Our Lady of the Assumption was founded in 1704 and at that time was dedicated to the Virgin Mary, a time when the only temple Camp Ribeirão Carmo was the Chapel of the Virgin. A small chapel made of mudbrick was then erected by the Portuguese miner António Pereira Machado. Work on the current church began in 1711, when Governor Antonio de Albuquerque declared the camp to be a town. Therefore, the church received a dedication to the Virgin. A first expansion took place between 1713 and 1718, commissioned by the master Jacinto Lopes Barbosa who reused the existing structure, which became the sacristy. In 1734 the building had already been quite damaged by the start of new works on the facade and tower under the responsibility of the teacher António Coelho Fonseca. Only in 1798 the exterior walls were rebuilt in stone and lime.

In 1745, with the creation of the Diocese of Mariana, the seat was elevated to cathedral dedicated to Our Lady of the Assumption.

See also
Roman Catholicism in Brazil
Our Lady of Assumption

References

Our Lady of Assumption
Mariana, Minas Gerais
Roman Catholic churches completed in 1704
1704 establishments in Brazil
18th-century Roman Catholic church buildings in Brazil